Israeli-Moroccan relations are the official relations between the State of Israel and the Kingdom of Morocco. While Morocco did not have formal diplomatic relations with Israel until 2020, the relationship between the two was secretly maintained after the establishment of Israel in 1948. For many years, Moroccan King Hassan II facilitated the secret relationship with Israel, and it was considered instrumental in stabilizing Morocco and beating possible anti-royal threats within the country. The former secret relationship continued to play an important role in growing Israeli–Moroccan ties, despite the lack of formal relations until 2020. The Israeli passport is accepted for entry into Morocco with a visa granted on arrival. On 10 December 2020, Israel and Morocco agreed to establish diplomatic relations, becoming the sixth Arab league member to recognise Israel and the fourth in the space of four months, along with Bahrain, the United Arab Emirates, and Sudan. It then communicated to Israeli Prime Minister Benjamin Netanyahu its recognition of Israel.

History

Early years
Morocco had a large Jewish population prior to Israel's independence from the British in 1948, and hundreds of thousands of Israeli Jews are of Moroccan origin. The 1948 riots of Oujda and Jerada prompted the majority of Moroccan Jews to flee from the country.

Reign of Moroccan King Hassan II

Under Hassan II, the topic of Israel was highly controversial in Morocco, and for this reason contacts with Israel were only made under the table. During what is known as Operation Yachin, Morocco allowed 97,000 Jews to emigrate to Israel between November 1961 and spring 1964. They, however, only allowed this in exchange for money: Israel paid $100 per immigrant for the first 50,000 Jews, and $250 per immigrant thereafter.

In the 1965 Arab League Summit in Casablanca, Hassan II invited Israeli spies from Shin Bet and Mossad to spy on the other Arab leaders' activities, thus was instrumental in causing the Arabs' defeat to Israel in the 1967 Six-Day War.

In contrast, during the Yom Kippur War, Morocco supported the Arab coalition by sending an expeditionary force of 5,500 men to the Golan and the Sinai.

During 1980s, Hassan II attempted to break the deadlock to recognize Israel by meeting with Israeli Prime Minister Shimon Peres in Rabat in 1986, but was met with backlash and protests from the Arab League and Moroccans alike, forcing Hassan II to withdraw his attempt. Nonetheless, Hassan II maintained a bond with Peres, and Peres voiced his condolences when Hassan II died in 1999. According to The New York Times some diplomats said  the Moroccan king's initiative to meet Mr. Peres, was the product of several factors. One factor, they said, was that King Hassan was increasingly frustrated by the lack of progress in the Middle East peace process, which has been stalemated. Even more important, diplomats said, was King Hassan's unsuccessful efforts to convene an Arab summit meeting here, despite months of maneuvering and overtures to ''moderate'' Arab leaders.

Reign of Moroccan King Mohammed VI

Like late Hassan II, his son King Mohammed VI of Morocco, whose reign began in 1999, maintained unofficial relations with Israel. Mohammed VI's advisor, André Azoulay, is an instrumental Jewish Moroccan who facilitated the growth of Morocco in both economic and political terms.

Morocco also attempted to solve the Israeli–Palestinian conflict by dispatching another Jewish aide close to Israel, Sam Ben Shitrit, to solve the conflict and make peace between the two.

The two countries established low-level diplomatic relations during the 1990s following Israel's interim peace accords with the Palestinian Authority. Until the early 2000s, Morocco operated a liaison office in Tel Aviv and Israel one in Rabat, until they both were closed during the Second Intifada. The two countries have maintained informal ties since then, with an estimated 50,000 Israelis traveling to Morocco each year on trips to learn about the Jewish community and retrace their family histories.

Due to the growing anti-Iranian sentiment on both sides, as both countries have problems with the Iranian regime led by conservative Islamists, Morocco and Israel have sought to make their ties closer. Both countries participated in the US-led February 2019 Warsaw Conference, aimed to be anti-Iranian.

In January 2020, Morocco received three Israeli drones as part of a $48 million arms deal.

Israel–Morocco normalization agreement 

In September 2020, U.S. President Donald Trump announced he was seeking direct flights between Rabat and Tel Aviv.

On 10 December 2020, Donald Trump announced that Israel and Morocco had agreed to establish full diplomatic relations. Morocco then communicated to Israeli Prime Minister Benjamin Netanyahu its recognition of Israel.  As part of the agreement, the United States agreed to recognize Morocco's Annexation of Western Sahara while urging the parties to "negotiate a mutually acceptable solution" using Morocco's autonomy plan as the only framework.

On 22 December, El Al launched the first direct commercial flight between Israel and Morocco following the normalization agreement. Senior Advisor to the U.S. President Jared Kushner and Israel's National Security Advisor Meir Ben-Shabbat were among the high-level officials on board the flight.

On 25 July 2021, two Israeli carriers launched direct commercial flights to Marrakesh from Tel Aviv. On 11 August 2021, Morocco and Israel signed three accords on political consultations, aviation and culture. In November 2021, Morocco and Israel signed a defense agreement.

Israeli President Isaac Herzog and King Mohammed VI began a correspondence after the normalization of relations. Herzog sent King Mohammed a letter during Foreign Minister Yair Lapid’s visit to Morocco, and the King replied in August 2021 with a letter in which he wrote: “I am convinced that we shall make this momentum sustainable in order to promote the prospects of peace for all peoples in the region.” Herzog also sent condolences to King Mohammed after the tragic death of the little boy Rayan, who died after falling down a well, prompting a high-profile rescue effort.

Jews in Morocco

Jews have a long historical presence in Morocco, where they are presently the largest Jewish community in the Arab World. The Moroccan government has tolerated its Jewish community, even after the establishment of the State of Israel in 1948, facilitating the secret tie between Israel and Morocco. Moroccan-organized Jewish emigration to Israel continued while the kingdom still managed to maintain strong ties with the Israeli government through its remaining Jews. Moroccan mellahs (Jewish Quarters) also exist in some cities.

Morocco is the only Arab nation to have a Jewish museum, which has been praised by Moroccans and Jewish communities alike. A large community of Moroccan Jews live around the world.

See also
Moroccan Jews in Israel
Moroccan Jewish Museum
Israel–Morocco normalization agreement

References

Further reading
Questions about Jewish migrations from Morocco
Research on Moroccan Jewry

Israel–Morocco relations
Bilateral relations of Morocco
Morocco